John William Fowler (born 16 July 1954) is an Australian high school teacher and a former mayor of the City of South Sydney.

Early life
Fowler was born in Sydney and attended Newington College (1968–1971).

City of South Sydney
Fowler was an independent councillor for the City of South Sydney  from 1989 until becoming the first non-Labour mayor in 2000. He served in that role until the council was merged with the Sydney City Council. He was the first openly gay mayor in Sydney.

References

1954 births
Living people
People educated at Newington College
Gay politicians
Independent politicians in Australia
Australian gay men
LGBT mayors of places in Australia
Mayors of places in New South Wales